The Cajo Project is a framework that enables multiple Java applications that are spread across multiple machines to work together as one transparently and dynamically.
This framework is useful for both open/free and proprietary applications that need distributed computing capabilities. It is capable of being used on almost any Java-equipped platform (JRE/JME 1.2 or higher) (mobile phones, mainframes, servers, embedded devices etc.) It is a “drop-in” framework, because it does not impose any structural requirements or source code changes and is 100% pure Java with no XML code. It also is not dependent on any other frameworks and can work behind NAT, firewalls, even HTTP proxies.

History
The Cajo Project has been issued by the IANA port number 1198 and UDP Multicast address 224.0.23.162.

License
The source code is free under the LGPL, and the documentation is free under the GFDL.

Usage

Overview
Using the Cajo Project, ordinary unmodified Java objects, can be remote using a single line of code:

Itemserver.bind(someObject, "someName")

These can then be used by remote machines either statically, or dynamically.

Static remote object usage
Static remote object usage is typically performed when there are one or more interfaces to the object, defining how the client may use it, known at Compile time. For example:

public interface SomeInterface {   ... // method signatures}

The remote object implements this interface, and possibly others, then remotes the object as shown previously.

Static remote object usage is provided through a TransparentItemProxy. The user of a remote object can create a reference to this object, which actually implements the shared interface, as follows:

SomeInterface si = (SomeInterface)TransparentItemProxy.getItem("//someHost:1198/someName", new Class[...] {SomeInterface.class}  )

A remote machine may now invoke methods on the remote object, with the exact Java syntax and semantics, as if it were local.

Dynamic remote object usage
Dynamic remote object usage is typically performed when the interface to an object will be determined at runtime. This is often the case when using Cajo remote objects in a scripting. A machine dynamically uses a remote object reference as follows:

// obtain reference
Object object = Remote.getItem("//someHost:1198/someName"); 

// typically obtained at runtime
String someMethod = "someMethod"; 

// also obtained at runtime
Object someArgs = new Object[...] { someArgs, ... }; 

Object result = Remote.invoke(object, someMethod, someArgs);

This snippet invokes a method on a remote object, providing the arguments, (if any) and returning the result. (if any)

The cajo framework can allow a machine to remote its object reference using UDP with IP multicast. This technique lets machines interested to use remote references, simply listen for the announcements. This provides a One-to-many linkage mechanism, where the users of the remote object do not need to know the TCP/IP address of the host machine.

Remote graphical user interfaces
The Cajo Project is also used to remote graphical user interfaces. This allows an application to run its view on separate machines from its model, and even its controller objects.

See also
Java remote method invocation

References

External links
https://web.archive.org/web/20060925101254/https://cajo.dev.java.net/ The cajo project page
http://java.net/projects/cajo The cajo SDK project page
Official IANA port number Announcement 
IANA Multicast Address Announcement 
Internet Multicast Addresses 

Java platform